Ramdass is a city, near Amritsar city and a municipal council in Amritsar district in the Indian state of Punjab. It is situated on the bank of Ravi river. It is a border area. 

It is an ancient holy city. It is nearly 50 K.M. far from Amritsar. It is connected through railway line (Amritsar - Verka - Fatehgarh Churrian - Ramdass - Gurdaspur - Dera Baba Nanak) and all weather concrete road (Amritsar - Ajnala - Ramdass - Dera Baba Nanak and Amritsar - Majitha - Fatehgarh Churrian - Ramdass). Dera Baba Nanak (Kartarpur Corridor, Pakistan) is 14 K.M. far away from Ramdas.

In ancient times Baba Budha (ਬਾਬਾ ਬੁੱਢਾ ਜੀ) ji lived here. His last cremation was done here by Guru Hargobind Ji, sixth Sikh Guru. In His remembrance two Gurudwaras are built here named Gurudwara Tappasthan (ਗੁਰੂਦੁਆਰਾ ਤਪ ਅਸਥਾਨ)  and Gurudwara Smadha (ਗੁਰੂਦੁਆਰਾ ਸਮਾਧਾਂ).

Demographics
 India census, Ramdass had a population of 5790. Males constitute 53% of the population and females 47%. Ramdass has an average literacy rate of 62%, higher than the national average of 59.5%: male literacy is 67%, and female literacy is 56%. In Ramdass, 14% of the population is under 6 years of age. Ramdass city belongs to the Jat Sikh Bal clan.

References

Cities and towns in Amritsar district